Emma Josepha Sparre ( 29 June 1851–8 September 1913) was a Swedish painter.

Biography
Emma Josepha Sparre née Munktell was born at Grycksbo in Dalarna County, Sweden. She was the daughter of Henrik Munktell (1804–1861) and Christina Augusta Eggertz (1818–1889). She was the sister of composer Helena Munktell (1852–1919).

She was married to fellow artist Baron Carl Axel Ambjörn Sparre (1839–1910) from 1870 to 1891. They had a daughter, Märta Améen (1871–1940) who was also a painter.

She attended the Royal Academy of Art in Stockholm and was trained privately by August Malmström. She later studied in Düsseldorf and Rome. She also trained Paris with painters Pascal-Adolphe-Jean Dagnan-Bouveret and Gustave Courtois at Académie Colarossi.

Sparre  exhibited her work at the Palace of Fine Arts at the 1893 World's Columbian Exposition in Chicago, Illinois. She also exhibited at the 1889 Exposition Universelle in Paris, where she received an honorable mention.

She returned to Sweden in the 1890s. Sparre died in 1913 in Rättvik in Dalarna County, Sweden.

Her work is in the collection of the Nationalmuseum in Stockholm.

Gallery

References

External links
 
 images of Emma Sparre's art on MutualArt

1851 births
1913 deaths
Swedish women painters
19th-century Swedish women artists
20th-century Swedish women artists
19th-century Swedish painters
20th-century Swedish painters
People from Falun Municipality
Académie Julian alumni